
Gmina Złoczew is an urban-rural gmina (administrative district) in Sieradz County, Łódź Voivodeship, in central Poland.

Villages
Apart from the town of Złoczew, Gmina Złoczew contains the villages and settlements of Andrzejówka, Biesiec, Borzęckie, Broszki, Broszki-Kolonia, Bujnów, Bujnów-Kolonia, Burdynówka, Czarna, Dąbrowa Miętka, Doliny, Emilianów, Filipole, Galbierka, Glina, Górki, Grójec Mały, Grójec Wielki, Grójec Wielki-Gajówka, Grójec Wielki-Leśniczówka, Gronówek, Jaryszek, Jaźwiny, Jeże, Kamasówka, Kamasze, Kita, Koźliny, Kresy, Krzyżanka, Łagiewniki,  Łeszczyn, Lipiny, Ługi, Miklesz, Miklesz-Kolonia, Młyn, Napłatek, Niwa, Obojęcie, Pieczyska, Pogony, Pokarczemna, Pokowalska, Potok, Prusaki, Przerwa, Przylepka, Robaszew, Serwitut (sołectwo Czarna), Serwitut (sołectwo Stolec), Siekanie, Stanisławów, Stara Wieś, Stolec, Stolec Poduchowny, Struga, Szklana Huta, Szlachecka, Uników, Uników Poduchowny, Uników-Kolonia, Wandalin, Wandalin nad Szosą, Wilkołek Grójecki, Wilkołek Unikowski, Zapowiednik and Zawiatraki.

Neighbouring gminas
Gmina Złoczew is bordered by the gminas of Brąszewice, Brzeźnio, Burzenin, Klonowa, Konopnica, Lututów and Ostrówek.

References
 Polish official population figures 2006

Zloczew
Sieradz County